Ditylometopa is a genus of flies in the family Stratiomyidae.

Species
Ditylometopa centralensis Woodley, 2009
Ditylometopa elegans Kertész, 1923

References

Stratiomyidae
Brachycera genera
Taxa named by Kálmán Kertész
Diptera of South America